The European Physical Journal B: Condensed Matter and Complex Systems is a peer-reviewed scientific journal that covers condensed matter physics, statistical and nonlinear physics, and complex systems.  Part of the European Physical Journal series, it is jointly published by EDP Sciences, the Società Italiana di Fisica, and Springer Science+Business Media.

Abstracting and indexing
The European Physical Journal B is indexed in the following databases:

Science Citation Index
Journal Citation Reports
Materials Science Citation Index
Chemical Abstracts Service
CSA - ProQuest
Zentralblatt Math

See also
European Physical Journal

References

Physics journals
Springer Science+Business Media academic journals
EDP Sciences academic journals
Publications established in 1998
Monthly journals